Medieval Games is a party video game developed by American studio n-Fusion Interactive and published by Vir2L Studios for Nintendo's Wii console. It was developed by N-Fusion and was unveiled in December 2008. It was released on October 20, 2009 in North America and on November 27 in Europe.

Gameplay
Medieval Games is a party video game set in a storybook medieval world. The game is similar to the Mario Party series by Nintendo. The game has a story mode with a story based on the Middle Ages, in which you play as a court jester named Scrunth, with each chapter raising Scrunth in the social hierarchy, with the last chapter he is named King of the Fools. The game features 30 Medieval mini-games including sword fighting, jousting, archery and catapulting. The game supports up to 4-player local multiplayer. The game aims to take full advantage of the Wii's motion capabilities. Most of the actions on the game-boards and mini-games requires motion-controls.
It also has 2 vs 2 and 1 vs 3 minigames where player 1 is always the solo.

Reception
Medieval Games received generally bad reviews after its launch. Some reviewers criticised the game's bad motion controls and lack of depth and personality. Common Sense Media said that the control-scheme could only be enjoyed by an ogre, and was generally negative towards the game.

References

2009 video games
Multiplayer and single-player video games
Party video games
Video games developed in the United States
Video games set in the Middle Ages
Vir2L Studios games
Wii games
Wii-only games